The Night Owl is Gregg Karukas' first album.

Track listing 
"Drive Time"
"Lady in my Heart"
"Walkin' with You"
"Alena"
"The Nightowl"
"Calypso Dance"
"Magic Cat"
"Talbot Street Cafe"
"C.I. to the Eye"

Personnel 
 Gregg Karukas – piano
 Jay Dulaney – electric bass
 Ken Navarro – electric guitar
 Gary Meek – saxophone
 Steve Samuel - percussion, timbals
 Jeff Pescetto - vocals

1987 albums
Gregg Karukas albums